Banco Penta was a bank in Chile. It is headquartered in Santiago, Chile This was founded by millionaires Carlos Alberto Délano Abbott, and Roberto Cordova it was a bank dedicated to finances and investments. this fell due to the financial crisis of 2008, and had to be sold for 2 million dollars.

References

External links
Official website

Banks of Chile